Sven Järve (born 25 July 1980) is an Estonian épée fencer.

Jarve won the bronze medal at the épée 2006 World Fencing Championships after he lost 15–12 to Joaquim Videira in the semi final.

Achievements
 2006 World Fencing Championships, épée

Record Against Selected Opponents
Includes results from 2006–present and athletes who have reached the quarterfinals of the World Championships or Olympic Games, plus fencers who have received medals in major team competitions.

  Gábor Boczkó 1–0
  Alfredo Rota 1–1
  Joaquim Videira 0–1
  Robert Andrzejuk 0–1
  Érik Boisse 1–2
  Ignacio Canto 2–2
  Stefano Carozzo 0–2
  Silvio Fernández 0–1
  Krisztián Kulcsár 1–0
  Ulrich Robeiri 0–1
  Vitaly Zakharov 2–1
  Jose Luis Abajo 0–3
  Diego Confalonieri 0–1
  Fabrice Jeannet 1–0
  Pavel Kolobkov 1–1
  Matteo Tagliariol 0–2
  Anton Avdeev 0–1
  Jérôme Jeannet 1–0

References

1980 births
Living people
Estonian male épée fencers
Sportspeople from Tallinn
20th-century Estonian people
21st-century Estonian people